Free2Luv is a youth empowerment nonprofit organization that is dedicated to celebrating equality, spreading kindness and standing up to bullying through arts entertainment and arts. They make impact through community outreach, empowerment events, thought-provoking awareness campaigns and cause-inspired merchandise.

References 

Youth organizations based in the United States
Organizations for LGBT people of color
Youth charities